Khipro (Urdu: کھپرو, Sindhi :کپرو ) is a taluka of Sanghar district, and subdivision of the NawabShah in Sindh, 

It is bounded to the east by India. The district capital, Sanghar.

History 
No clear reference describes the origin of the word Khipro. as of the word of mouth of population of Khipro City, its one of the historical places in White Thar,

Transport 
The nearest airport is Sindhri Tharparkar Airport (IATA: MPD) .

Geography 
Khipro is the biggest taluka of Pakistan. It consists of  acres of which 1,109,129 are desert, 11,475 forest and 191,647 agriculture.

Economy 
Its primary industry is agriculture. Cotton, Wheat, Sugar cane, and Chilies are major crops.

Culture

The city is a mixture of Hindu, Muslim and other communities where around 80 percent of the peoples are Muslim and the remaining 20 percent are Hindu. In the Muslims most of the peoples belongs to Lashari, Gajju Hingorja, Chohan, Jatt, Bozdar, Malik,Qaim khani, Syed, lohar,Qureshi,Baloch, Laghari, Rajar, Dars, Hingorjan, Khaskheli, Samejo, Junejo communities and in Hindus most of the peoples belongs to Goswami, Lohana, Khatri, Malhi, Bhil, Kolhi, Guriro, Oad, (Sodha) Rajput and others communities.

See also

 List of talukas of Sindh

References
Complete History of Taluka Khipro  

Populated places in Sanghar District